Larned High School is the public high school in Larned, Kansas, United States, and operated by Fort Larned USD 495 school district. The sports teams are called the Indians and the school colors are black and orange.

History
Larned High School was established in 1890 and offered a 3-year school program. In 1904 it began offering a standard 4-year curriculum.

Notable alumni
 Gene Keady, basketball coach, head men's basketball coach at Purdue University for 25 years, from 1980 to 2005.
 Agnes Unruh (later Agnes Unruh Wilson), a University of Kansas graduate, was the principal during the 1904 - 1905 school year.
John Zook, football player

See also
 List of high schools in Kansas
 List of unified school districts in Kansas

References

Public high schools in Kansas
Pawnee County, Kansas
1890 establishments in Kansas